Gianetti Oliveira de Sena Bonfim (born 13 March 1965) is a Brazilian female former racewalking athlete who competed in the 20 kilometres race walk. Her best for that distance was 1:41:07 hours. She was twice a medallist at the South American Championships in Athletics. She was a seven-time national champion at the Troféu Brasil de Atletismo, winning consecutively from 1996 to 2002.

Bonfim was a three-time competitor at the IAAF World Race Walking Cup, being part of the Brazilian teams in 1999, 2002 and 2004. Her best finish was 62nd. She was the 10,000 m walk gold medallist at the 1996 Ibero-American Championships in Athletics – being the first Brazilian to win a walking title at the competition.

Her son, Caio Bonfim, is also an international racewalker for Brazil.

International competitions

National titles
Troféu Brasil de Atletismo
10 km walk: 1996, 1997, 1998
20 km walk: 1999, 2000, 2001, 2002

References

External links

Living people
1965 births
Brazilian female racewalkers
20th-century Brazilian women
21st-century Brazilian women